Chennai Live (a part of the Muthoot Group) is a radio station in the city of Chennai.

Chennai Live started off as the city's first talk- radio station in 2008, with a variety of shows on current events, sports, lifestyle and more.

Chennai Live 104.8FM is the only English radio station in the city and plays international music from an array of genres such as pop, rock, rock & roll, R&B, hip-hop, top 100 hits, and more. The station also features independent English music by musicians the state of Tamil Nadu. In 2020, Chennai Live discontinued their status as a radio station, but remain active through digital media.

References 

Radio stations in Chennai
English-language mass media in India
Muthoot Group